Czech Americans, known in the 19th and early 20th century as Bohemian Americans, are citizens of the United States whose ancestry is wholly or partly originate from the Czech lands, a term which refers to the majority of the traditional lands of the Bohemian Crown, namely Bohemia, Moravia and Czech Silesia. These lands over time have been governed by a variety of states, including the Kingdom of Bohemia, the Austrian Empire, Czechoslovakia, and the Czech Republic also known by its short-form name, Czechia. Germans from the Czech lands who emigrated to the United States are usually identified as German Americans, or, more specifically, as Americans of German Bohemian descent. According to the 2000 US census, there are 1,262,527 Americans of full or partial Czech descent, in addition to 441,403 persons who list their ancestry as Czechoslovak. Historical information about Czechs in America is available thanks to people such as Mila Rechcigl.

History
The first documented case of the entry of Czechs to the North American shores is of Joachim Gans of Prague, who came to Roanoke, North Carolina in 1585 with an expedition of explorers organized by Sir Walter Raleigh (1552–1618).

Augustine Herman (1621–1686) was the first documented Czech settler. He was a surveyor and skilled draftsman, successful planter and developer of new lands, a shrewd and enterprising merchant, a bold politician and effective diplomat, fluent in several languages. After coming to New Amsterdam (present New York), he became one of the most influential people in the Dutch Province which led to his appointment to the Council of Nine to advise the New Amsterdam Governor Peter Stuyvesant. One of his greatest achievements was his celebrated map of Maryland and Virginia commissioned by Lord Baltimore on which he began working in earnest after removing to the English Province of Maryland. Lord Baltimore was so pleased with the map that he rewarded Herman with a large estate, named by Herman "Bohemia Manor", and the hereditary title Lord.

There was another Bohemian living in New Amsterdam at that time, Frederick Philipse (1626–1720), who became equally famous. He was a successful merchant who, eventually, became the wealthiest person in the entire Dutch Province. Philipse was originally from Bohemia, from an aristocratic Protestant family who had to leave their native land to save their lives, after the Thirty Years' War.

The first significant wave of Czech colonists was of the Moravian Brethren who began arriving on the American shores in the first half of the 18th century. Moravian Brethren were the followers of the teachings of the Czech religious reformer and martyr Jan Hus (1370–1415), Petr Chelčický and Bishop John Amos Comenius (1592–1670). They were true heirs of the ancient "Unitas fratrum bohemicorum" - Unity of the Brethren, who found a temporary refuge in Herrnhut in Lusatia under the patronage of Count Nikolaus Zinzendorf (1700–1760). Because of the worsening political and religious situation in Saxony, the Moravian Brethren, as they began calling themselves, decided to emigrate to North America.

This group started coming in 1735, when they first settled in Savannah, Georgia, and then in Pennsylvania, from which they spread to other states after the American Revolution, especially Ohio. The Moravians established a number of settlements, such as Bethlehem and Lititz in Pennsylvania and Salem in North Carolina. Moravians made great contributions to the growth and development of the US. Cultural contributions of Moravian Brethren from the Czech lands were distinctly notable in the realm of music. The trumpets and horns used by the Moravians in Georgia are the first evidence of Moravian instrumental music in America.

In 1776, at the time of the Declaration of Independence, more than two thousand Moravian Brethren lived in the colonies. President Thomas Jefferson designated special lands to the missionaries to civilize the Indians and promote Christianity. The free uncultivated land in America encouraged immigration throughout the nineteenth century; most of the immigrants were farmers and settled in the Midwestern states. The first major immigration of Czechs occurred in 1848 when the Czech "Forty Eighters" fled to the United States to escape the political persecution by the Austrian Habsburgs. During the American Civil War, Czechs served in both the Confederate and Union army, but as with most immigrant groups, the majority fought for the Union. 

Immigration resumed and reached a peak in 1907, when 13,554 Czechs entered the eastern ports. Unlike previous immigration, new immigrants were predominantly Catholic. Although some of the anticlericalism of the Czechs in Europe came to the United States, Czech Americans are, on the whole, much more likely to be practicing Catholics than Czechs in Europe. 

By 1910, the Czech population was 349,000, and by 1940 it was 1,764,000. The U.S. Bureau of the Census reported that nearly 800,000 Czechs were residing in the U.S. in 1970. Since that figure did not include Czechs who had been living in the U.S. for several generations, it is reasonable to assume that the actual number was higher. Additionally, Czech immigrants in America often had different claims of origin in records. Before 1918, many Czechs would be listed as from Bohemia or Moravia or vaguely Austria or Silesia. Some were also counted as from Germany if they were German-speakers or rarely Polish if the recorder could not distinguish the language. Slovaks were often listed as from Hungary. After the formation of Czechoslovakia in 1918, Czechs and Slovaks were also listed under the new blanket category.

The Czech American community gained a high public profile in 1911, with the kidnapping and murder in Chicago of the five-year old Elsie Paroubek. The Czech American community mobilized massively to help in the searches for the girl and support her family, and it gained much sympathy from the general American public.

Population

The top 50 U.S. communities with the highest percentage of people claiming Czech ancestry
The top 50 U.S. communities with the highest percentage of people claiming Czech ancestry are:
Conway, ND 55.2%  
West, TX 40.9%
Oak Creek, NE 38.2%
Wilber, NE 37.3%
Shiner, TX 32.1%
Montgomery, MN (township) 30.9%
Lonsdale, MN 30.5%
Wheatland, MN 29.9%
Tyndall, SD 29.5%
David City, NE 28.0%
Montgomery, MN (city) 26.3%
Franklin, WI 26.1%
Lanesburgh, MN 25.2%
Granger, TX 25.1%
Port Costa, CA 24.0%
Schulenburg, TX 23.7%
New Prague, MN and Erin, MN 23.5%
Wahoo, NE 22.7%
Carlton, WI 22.4%
Wallis, TX 22.0%
Hallettsville, TX 21.5%
Hale, MN 20.8%
Montpelier, WI 19.7%
Flatonia, TX 19.5%
West Kewaunee, WI 19.2%
Schuyler, NE and Webster, NE 19.0%
Gibson, WI 18.9%
Hillsboro, WI 18.4%
Kossuth, WI 18.2%
Lexington, MN 18.1%
Mishicot, WI 16.9%
Kewaunee, WI and North Bend, NE 16.7%
Franklin, WI 15.9%
Oak Grove, WI and Caldwell, TX 15.7%
Lake Mary, MN 15.4%
Solon, IA 15.2%
Mishicot, WI 15.0%
Helena, MN 14.9%
Marietta, NE 14.7%
Stickney, IL 14.5%
Ord, NE (township) and Weimar, TX 14.3%
Crete, NE 14.2%
Park River, ND 14.1%
Ord, NE (city) and La Grange, TX 14.0%
Wagner, SD 13.6%
Needville, TX 13.2%
Calmar, IA and Worcester, WI 13.0%
Webster, MN 12.9%
North Riverside, IL 12.4%
Belle Plaine, IA 12.3%
El Campo, TX 12.2%

U.S. communities with the most residents born in the Czech Republic (former Czechoslovakia)
The top U.S. communities with the most residents born in the Czech Republic (former Czechoslovakia) are:
Masaryktown, FL 3.1%
Mifflinville, PA 2.2%
Gulf Shores, AL 2.1%
North Riverside, IL and Sharon Springs, NY 2.0%
Lyons, IL 1.6%
Rose, WI, North Lynbrook, NY and Anna Maria, FL 1.5%
Oakbrook Terrace, IL and Danville, AR 1.4%
Bee Ridge, FL, Cameron, TX, Lenox, MA, Verdigre, NE, and Willowbrook, IL 1.2%
Lower Grand Lagoon, FL, Beachwood, OH, Allamuchy-Panther Valley, NJ, Mahopac, NY, Black Diamond, FL, and Glenview, KY 1.1%
Key West, FL, Woodstock, NY, Madison Park, NJ, Belleair Beach, FL, South Amboy, NJ, Colver, PA, Herricks, NY, Horine, MO, Shelburne, MA, and Gang Mills, NY 1.0%

The states with the largest Czech American populations
The states with the largest Czech American populations are:

However, these figures are grossly understated when second and third generation descendants are included.

The states with the top percentages of Czech Americans
The states with the top percentages of Czech Americans are:

Notable people

Festivals 

Many cities in the United States hold festivals celebrating Czech culture and cuisine.

Iowa
Cedar Rapids, Iowa - Saint Ludmila's Church - June
Protivin, Iowa - Czech Days.  August
Kansas
Wilson, Kansas - Czech Festival, last weekend in July.
Maryland
Parkville, Maryland - Czech and Slovak Heritage Festival. Started in 1987 to celebrate Baltimore's Czech and Slovak heritage.
Minnesota
Bechyn, Minnesota - Czechfest. 2nd Sunday in August.
Montgomery, Minnesota
Kolacky Days. 4th full weekend in July. Started in 1929.
Masopust. Sunday prior to Ash Wednesday
Miss Czech Slovak Minnesota Pageant - April
New Prague, Minnesota - Dozinky Festival - September
St. Paul, Minnesota - Czech and Slovak Festival - September 
Nebraska
Wilber, Nebraska - Wilber Czech Days
Verdigre, Nebraska - Kolach Days

Oklahoma
Prague, Oklahoma - Kolache Festival, First Saturday in May
Yukon, Oklahoma - Yukon Czech Festival, 1st Saturday in October 
Ohio
DTJ Taborville in Auburn Township, Geauga County, Ohio 
Cesky Den (Czech Day), 2nd Sunday in July, since 1923
Obzinky, 2nd Sunday in August, since 1934
South Dakota
Tabor, South Dakota - Czech Days, third Friday and Saturday in June - www.taborczechdays.com
Texas 
Ennis, Texas - National Polka Festival  three-day event is every Memorial Day weekend / Last weekend in May; event website: http://www.nationalpolkafestival.com/
Weimar
Hallettsville 4th weekend in March and last Saturday of September
Shiner Several lesser Czech and Kolache festivals are held in Shiner varying in size, occasion and date, where Shiner's largest contribution to Kolache festivities conjoins with the Hallettsville Kolache Festival and the annual Bocktober festival.
Yoakum 2nd week of June as part of the annual Tom-Tom Festival
Missouri City
Corpus Christi 3rd Saturday in March
Houston 4th Sunday in March and 3rd Sunday in May
Rosenberg First full weekend in May
Ennis Memorial Day Weekend
San Antonio First weekend in June and Last Sunday in October
East Bernard Second Saturday in June
Ammannsville Father's Day
Dubina First Sunday in July
Praha August 15
Flatonia Czilispiel during the last full weekend in October
Marak Last Sunday in August
West Labor Day Weekend
Caldwell Second Saturday in September
Pasadena 4th weekend in October
Crosby Annual Czech Fest is held the first Saturday in October. Sacred Heart Catholic Church in Crosby is the festivals organizer and was the original site of the festival. However, as the festival and Crosby have grown it has been held at the Crosby Fair and Rodeo grounds since about 1990.
Temple
Libuse Annual celebration held by the Louisiana Czech Heritage Association. Includes attractions such as Czech cuisine, Czech dancers, and a showing of the history of the Czech community in Libuse, Louisiana.
Wisconsin
Hillsboro, Wisconsin - Český den, second full weekend in June. Started in 1983.
Kewaunee, Wisconsin - Czech & Kolache Festival, the 1st full weekend in August at the beautiful Heritage Farm.
Phillips, Wisconsin - Czech-Slovak Festival and Lidice & Ležáky Villages Memorial Service, 3rd full weekend in June. Started in 1988.

See also

 Czech Brazilians
 Czech Canadians
 Czech Texans
 Czech South Dakotans
 Demographics of the Czech Republic
 European Americans
 Czech Republic–United States relations

References

Further reading
 Bicha, Karel. The Czechs in Oklahoma (U of Oklahoma Press, 1980).
 Capek, Thomas. The Czechs (Bohemians) in America. Boston: Houghton Mifflin, 1920; reprinted New York: Arno Press, 1969.
 Epstein, Helen. Where She Came From: A Daughter's Search for her Mother's History.  Holmes & Meier, 1997.
 Grossman, Patricia. Radiant Daughter. Northwestern University Press, 2010.
 Habenicht, Jan. History of Czechs in America. St. Paul, MN: Czechoslovak Genealogical Society International, 1996.
 Hampl, Patricia. A Romantic Education. Houghton Mifflin, 1981.

 Laska, Vera. The Czechs in America, 1633-1977 (Oceana Publications, 1978).
 Molinari, Christine. "Czech Americans." in Gale Encyclopedia of Multicultural America, edited by Thomas Riggs, (3rd ed., vol. 1, Gale, 2014), pp. 619-632. online
 Rechcigl, Miloslav, Jr. Czechs and Slovaks in America. Boulder, CO: East European Monographs and New York: Columbia University Press, 2005.
 Rechcigl, Miloslav, Jr. Encyclopedia of Bohemian and Czech American Biography. Bloomington, IN: Authorhouse, 2016. 3 vols.
 Smith, Philip D. From Praha to Prague: Czechs in an Oklahoma Farm Town (U of Oklahoma Press, 2017).

External links 
Bohemian and Moravian Pioneers in Colonial America
Early Jewish Emigrants in America from the Czech lands
Czech Societies in the US
Writings on Czech Americans
Czech American Biography

 
American people of Czechoslovak descent
 
United States
European-American society